Mazon may refer to:

Places in the United States
 Mazon, Illinois, a village
 Mazon Creek fossils
 Mazon River
 Mazon station, Mazon, Illinois
 Mazon Township, Grundy County, Illinois

Organizations
MAZON: A Jewish Response to Hunger, a nonprofit organization dedicated to fighting world hunger

Surnames

José María Mazón Sainz (1901-1981), Spanish politician
José María Mazón Ramos (born 1951), Spanish politician
Lázaro Mazón Alonso (born 1959), Mexican politician

See also 
 Mason (disambiguation)